In enzymology, a flavonol 7-O-beta-glucosyltransferase is an enzyme that catalyzes the chemical reaction

UDP-glucose + a flavonol  UDP + a flavonol 7-O-beta-D-glucoside

Thus, the two substrates of this enzyme are UDP-glucose and flavonol, whereas its two products are UDP and flavonol 7-O-beta-D-glucoside.

This enzyme belongs to the family of glycosyltransferases, specifically the hexosyltransferases.  The systematic name of this enzyme class is UDP-glucose:flavonol 7-O-beta-D-glucosyltransferase. This enzyme is also called UDP-glucose:flavonol 7-O-glucosyltransferase.

References

 

EC 2.4.1
Enzymes of unknown structure